The 1946 International cricket season was from April 1946 to August 1946.

Season overview

June

Test Trial in England

India in England

July

Ireland in Scotland

August

England in Netherlands

References

1946 in cricket